A radium release hitch is a load-releasing hitch using 3:1 mechanical advantage which is used in a two-rope technical rescue system. The Radium Release Hitch allows a load to be transferred from one rope to another and is commonly rigged into the belay line prior to the operation of a two-rope technical rescue system.

A radium release hitch is typically tied with 10 meters of 8mm rope and two locking carabiners. A reasonable length for the hitch (distance between the 2 carabiners) is 10 to 15 cm.

History 
The Radium Release Hitch was developed by Kirk Mauthner (who lives near Radium Hot Springs, hence the name) as a result of the extensive comparative analysis of release devices undertaken during 1997 through 1999

Usage 
 Passing knots
 Untensioning a locked lowering device or locked up prussiks.

Tying 
 Tie a figure 8 on a bight at one end of the cord and clip it into the load carabiner on its spine side.
 Clip the standing part of the rope through the anchor carabiner and back down through the load carabiner; bring the rope back up to the anchor carabiner.
 Tie a Münter hitch on its gate side of the anchor carabiner. Ensure that the Münter hitch is in the release position with the in-feed rope toward the gate side of the carabiner
 Secure the Radium Release Hitch using a bight to tie a half hitch on a bight around the entire stem below the Münter hitch, and then back it up with an overhand on a bight knot again around the entire stem.
 Tie a figure 8 on a bight at the other end, and clip it to a secure anchor.

See also 
List of knots

Mountain Rescue

References